John Cranch (1785–1816) was an English naturalist and explorer.

Explorer

John Cranch - 'Jack' to his friends - took part in an expedition in 1816 under Captain James Hingston Tuckey to discover the source of the River Congo, and died there.

Legacy

His friend William Elford Leach named nineteen new species and one new genus after him in his description of the expedition. These include for example the marine isopod crustacean Cirolana cranchi which he named in 1818.

Notes

1785 births
1816 deaths
English naturalists
Explorers of Africa
English explorers
19th-century English people
18th-century English people